San Diego High School is a public high school located in San Diego, Texas, United States. It is part of the San Diego Independent School District located in east central Duval County. In 2015, the school was rated "Met Standard" by the Texas Education Agency.

In addition to San Diego, the school district, of which San Diego HS is its sole comprehensive high school, serves the western part of Loma Linda East.

Clubs and extra-curriculars
FCCLA 
Future Farmers of America (FFA) 
Health Care Occupation Students of America (HOSA) 
National Honor Society (NHS) 
University Interscholastic League (UIL) 
Art Club 
Cheerleaders
Colorguard
Mariachi Azul y Oro 
Mighty Fighting Vaquero Band 
Student Council 
Theatre Arts
Yearbook

References

External links
 

Education in Duval County, Texas
Public high schools in Texas